Dispensation may refer to:

 Dispensation (Catholic canon law), the suspension, by competent authority, of general rules of law in particular cases in the Catholic Church
 (Common law) The former power of an English king to not apply a law in individual cases. See Sir Edward Hales, 3rd Baronet.
 Dispensation (period), a period in history according to various religions
 Dispensation (album), an album by Jimsaku
 Dispensation of the fulness of times, a concept in Mormon doctrine
 Dispensationalism

See also
 Classification of Pharmaco-Therapeutic Referrals
 Dispenser (disambiguation)
 Dispensing (disambiguation)